Sherringford may refer to:
Sherrinford Holmes, a fictional character
Sherrinford, a fictional prison in the Sherlock episode "The Final Problem"